Gollub may refer to:

Gollub War (1422), between the Teutonic Knights and Poland
Golub-Dobrzyń, a town in Poland

See also
 Golub (disambiguation)